Robert Janecki  (born 27 June 1974) is a Polish yachtsman.

He is an Ocean Yacht Master, Motorboat Master, navigator, routier. European champion class ILC 40 on the yacht MK Café with the crew led by Karol Jabłoński in 1998. Crew member of the catamaran Warta-Polpharma led by Roman Paszke in round the world yacht race The Race in 2000. Since 1999 member of the Race Team 2000 initiated by Roman Paszke. Between 2000-2004 journalist of the sailing magazine Rejs. Between 2005-2008 Polish National Sailing Team coach in Olympic class 470. Since 2010 has been leading the mountain biking team Renault Eco2 Team. He is also successful at other sports: mountain bike, long distance running, triathlon and ski running.

Biography 
Started sailing in 1983. In 1990 won the Polish Cup in Cadet class. In 1991 took 5th place in this class in the World Cup in Belgium. Between 1993-1995 was a crew member of the National Team in Olympic class 470 and represented the club BAZA Mrągowo, twice winning the  Polish Junior Championship in class 470 during this time.

In 1998 he took first place in the European Championship in class ILC 40 in Italy on the yacht MK Café. In the same year and on the same yacht led by Karol Jabłoński took 5th place in the World Championship in Spain.

In 2000 he took part in the round the world sailing race The Race on the maxi-catamaran Warta-Polpharma. During sailing seasons 2002-2004 he was a helmsman in the Volkswagen Yacht Race Team. In class 730 he is a double Polish Champion and a triple Polish Cup winner. He is a four-time winner in Grand Prix class 730 (Match Racing formula). In 2004 he took part in the attempt to break the record in round the world sailing on the class VOR60 yacht Bank BPH.

Between 2005 and 2008 he was a Polish National Sailing Team coach in Olympic class 470.
 
He was helmsman and navigator on the yacht Gemini 3 led by Roman Paszke during the record passage under sail from Świnoujście to Gdynia (8 hours 55 minutes 50 seconds) in October 2009. Was helmsman and navigator on the yacht Gemini 3 led by Roman Paszke during the record passage under sail from Las Palmas to Guadelupe (8 days 2 hours 38 minutes 11 seconds) in January 2011.

In total, he is a four-time Polish Champion and a four-time winner of the Polish Cup in different classes. He has sailed altogether over 140,000 nautical miles in different passages, races and regattas.

Three-time winner of the 24-hour mountain biking marathon Mazovia 24H (2009–2011).

In 2013 he finished the Warsaw Marathon in 3 hours 17 minutes 14 seconds.

From 2016 skipper and helmsman on catamaran R-SIX.

Achievements

Records

Other achievements

Private life 
Husband of Dorota, father of Gabriel and Michalina.

References

External links 
Paszke360.com
RenaultEco2Team.pl
Race2000.pl

Polish male sailors (sport)
1974 births
Living people
People from Mrągowo
Sportspeople from Warmian-Masurian Voivodeship